Pagan Occult Distribution System Network (PODSnet) was a neopagan/occult computer network of Pagan Sysops and Sysops carrying Pagan/Magickal/Occult oriented echoes operating on an international basis, with FIDO Nodes in  Australia, Canada, Germany, the U.K., and across the USA.  PODSnet grew rapidly, and at its height, was the largest privately distributed network of Pagans, Occultists, and other people of an esoteric bent on this planet.

Origins 

PODSnet grew out of an Echomail area/public forum (Echo) named MAGICK on FidoNet, which was created by J. Brad Hicks, the Sysop of the Weirdbase BBS back in 1985. MAGICK was the 8th Echo conference created on FidoNet. It quickly grew to 12 systems, and then went international when the first Canadian Pagan BBS, Solsbury Hill (Farrell McGovern, Sysop), joined. This was just a hint of its growth to come.

Another early expansion was the addition of two more echoes, MUNDANE and METAPHYSICAL. 

MUNDANE was created to move all "chat"; that is personal discussions, and other conversations that were of a non-pagan or magickal nature. Simultaneously, METAPHYSICAL was created for long, "article-style" posts of information on full rituals, papers and essays of a Pagan, Occult or Magickal nature.

These three were bundled as the "Magicknet Trio". If a BBS carried one, they had to carry all three.

At its height, there were over 50 "official" echoes that were considered part of the PODSNet backbone, with several others available.

Structure 

Similarly to FidoNet, PODSnet was organized into Zones, Regions, Networks, Nodes and Points; however, unlike FidoNet, these were not geographically determined, as the individual SysOp would determine from where to receive the network feed. Additionally, Points were more common within PODSnet due to the specialized nature of the network.

Like many open source and standards-based technology projects, FidoNet grew rapidly, and then forked. The addition of Zones to the Fidonet technology allowed for easier routing of email internationally, and the creation of networks outside of the control of International Fido Net Association (IFNA). As a number of associated Echos were added to the Magicknet Trio, the Sysops who carried them collectively decided to form their own network, the Pagan Occult Distribution System, or PODSnet. It asked for the zone number of 93, as the other popular occult-oriented zone numbers, 5 and 23 (see Discordianism) were already reserved.

PODSNet Book of Shadows 

One of the most enduring contributions to the online world was a collection of rituals, articles poetry and discussion collected by Paul Seymour of the Riders of the Crystal Wind, and often referred to as either the Internet Book of Shadows or the PODSNet Book of Shadows.  These volumes (there are seven in all) are, in fact, a collection of rituals, spells, recipes, messages, and essays from and among members of PODSNet. 

As PodsNet users came from various religious paths, from Asatru to Zen Buddhist, and their contributions as well as topical messages were compiled two to three times a year during the life of PODSNet.

Since the end of the BBS era, these files have circulated online on a number of services, often with introductory material stripped, and offered for sale on sites such as eBay.com. Charging money for the collection is in direct violation of the copyright notice within the volumes that the material is offered free of charge; additionally, portions of the content are under individual copyright by a variety of publishers, including Weiser, Llewellyn Publishing and others, as some texts were extracted in their entirety from published books. Other pieces have subsequently been formally published by their authors, including Dorothy Morrison, Mike Nichols and Isaac Bonewits, among others.

References

External links 

 Internet Archive of The PODSnet Internet home (official site temporary offline)
 J. Brad Hick's Homepage
 Jay Loveless's PODSnet page. Jay was one of PODSnet's administrators. (Page retrieved from the Internet Archive Wayback Machine as IO.COM is no longer on-line.)
 PODSNet Group Archive
 PODSNet Alumni Group on Facebook
 PODSnet "General Chat" Echo on Yahoo! Groups
 Vice's article on PODSnet by Tamlin Magee
 PODSNet modern forum

Bulletin board systems
Modern paganism and technology
Wide area networks
Modern pagan websites
1980s in modern paganism